1st Queens was an electoral district in the Canadian province of Prince Edward Island, which elected two members to the Legislative Assembly of Prince Edward Island from 1873 until the riding was abolished in 1996 with the elimination of dual member ridings.

The district comprised the westernmost portion of Queens County.

The district holds a unique place in the history of women's participation in Prince Edward Island's provincial politics. In 1970, it elected Jean Canfield to the legislature as the province's first female MLA; in 1979, the election of Marion Reid and Leone Bagnall made it the first district in the province's history to elect women to both of its legislative seats. Reid became the province's first female speaker of the legislature; after her retirement from electoral politics she also became the province's first female lieutenant governor. In 1993, the district elected Catherine Callbeck, the province's first female premier.

Members

Dual member

Assemblyman-Councillor

Queens 1
1873 establishments in Prince Edward Island
1996 disestablishments in Prince Edward Island
Constituencies established in 1873
Constituencies disestablished in 1996